Snow is a novel by Turkish writer Orhan Pamuk. Published in Turkish in 2002, it was translated into English by Maureen Freely and published in 2004. The story encapsulates many of the political and cultural tensions of modern Turkey and successfully combines humor, social commentary, mysticism, and deep sympathy with its characters.

Kar is the word for Snow, but the main character also abbreviates his name to Ka (his initials), with the novel set in the eastern Turkish city of Kars. An opening (and recurring) theme concerns reasons behind a suicide epidemic among teenage girls (which actually took place in the city of Batman).

Plot summary
Though most of the early part of the story is told in the third person from Ka's point of view, an omniscient narrator sometimes makes his presence known, posing as a friend of Ka's who is telling the story based on Ka's journals and correspondence. This narrator sometimes provides the reader with information before Ka knows it or foreshadows later events in the story. At times, the action seems somewhat dream-like. The story is set in the city of Kars which creates a sense of alienation for Ka as the city is unlike anywhere else in Turkey, due to its history as a Russian garrison town.

Ka is a poet, who returns to Turkey after 12 years of political exile in Germany. He has several motives, first, as a journalist, to investigate a spate of suicides but also in the hope of meeting a woman he used to know. Heavy snow cuts off the town for about three days during which time Ka is in conversation with a former communist, a secularist, a fascist nationalist, a possible Islamic extremist, Islamic moderates, young Kurds, the military, the Secret Service, the police and in particular, an actor-revolutionary. In the midst of this, love and passion are to be found. Temporarily closed off from the world, a farcical coup is staged and linked melodramatically to a stage play. 
The main discussion concerns the interface of secularism and belief but there are references to all of Turkey's twentieth-century history.

Ka reunites with a woman named İpek, whom he once had feelings for, whose father runs the hotel he is staying in. Ipek is divorced from Muhtar, partly due to Muhtar's newfound interest in political Islam. In a café, Ka and Ipek witness the shooting of the local Director of the Institute of Education by a Muslim extremist from out of town. The shooter blames the director for the death of a young woman named Teslime, claiming she killed herself because of the director's ban on headscarves in school. After the incident, Ka visits Muhtar, who tells him about his experience of finding Islam, which relates to a blizzard and meeting a charismatic sheikh named Saadettin Efendi. The police pick up Ka and Muhtar as part of their investigation of the Director's murder. Ka is questioned and Muhtar is beaten.

Though he has suffered from writer's block for a number of years, Ka suddenly feels inspired and composes a poem called "Snow", which describes a mystic experience. Other poems follow. At İpek's suggestion, Ka goes to see Sheikh Saadettin and confesses that he associates religion with backwardness that he does not want himself or Turkey to fall into. But he feels a sense of comfort with the sheikh and begins to accept his new poems as gifts from God.

Ka is impressed by Necip, a student at the religious high school, who, like many of the young Muslims at the school, is quite taken by Kadife. The narrator lets the reader know that Necip will die soon. Growing tensions between secularists and Islamists explode during a televised event at the National Theater. A secular group puts on a classic play condemning head scarves; during the play, a number of soldiers take positions on stage. The Islamists react to the play in a very chaotic way. Immediately after this, the soldiers on stage start firing at the audience. Necip is among those killed. The police and military establish martial law, and Ka is taken in for questioning because he has been seen with Islamists. He is shattered to find Necip's body in the morgue and identifies him as the one who led him to Blue.

Ka is taken to meet Sunay Zaim, an actor whose group put on the play at the National Theater and who is now orchestrating the round-ups and investigations of suspicious persons. Zaim is a staunch Turkish Republican, who has played political leaders such as Robespierre, Napoleon, and Lenin, but whose dream of playing Atatürk, the founder of the Turkish Republic, was frustrated. As the snow has made the roads and railroads impassable, no outside authorities are able to intervene in the coup. The isolation of Kars, and Zaim's old friendship with the officer in charge of the local garrison, enabled him to become a revolutionary dictator in real life as well as on the stage, for at least a few days — his act being simultaneously a coup d'état and a coup de théâtre.

At this point, the narrator, who identifies himself as a novelist named Orhan, flashes forward four years and reveals that Ka spent the last years of his life obsessing over İpek and writing unsent letters to her before being murdered in Frankfurt. The narrator will play a much larger role in the story in the novel's later chapters. We are clearly meant to identify the narrator with Orhan Pamuk himself, as he later names The Black Book as one of his works, as well as The Museum of Innocence, which he would publish in 2008.

Turgut Bey attends a meeting at which representatives from the various factions opposed to the coup, including Islamists, leftists, and Kurds, attempt to produce a coherent statement to the European press denouncing the action. After Blue is arrested and held by the nationalists, Ka negotiates a deal with Sunay Zaim that will result in Blue's release, as long as Kadife agrees to play a role in Zaim's production of Thomas Kyd's The Spanish Tragedy and removes her head-scarf on live television during the show. Both Kadife and Blue agree.

After a scene in which Ka is seen confused and tormented by feelings of pain and jealousy, the narrative describing events from his point of view abruptly breaks off. The narrator explains that Ka had left behind a detailed account of his acts and feelings while in Kars, but that there was no reference to his last hours in the city, and it is left to his friend Orhan to try to reconstruct these by following in Ka's footsteps, visiting the places where he had been and meeting the people he had met.

Ka's actions immediately after leaving the theater remain a mystery that is never completely untangled. Orhan is, however, able to establish that Ka was later taken by the military to the train station, where he was put on the first train scheduled to leave once the railroad reopened. Ka complied but sent soldiers to retrieve İpek for him. However, just as İpek said her farewells to her father, news arrived that Blue and Hande were shot. İpek was shattered and blamed Ka for leading the police to Blue's hideout. Instead of going to Ka, she and her father went to the theater to see Kadife.

In the end it is disclosed that a new group of Islamic militants was formed by younger followers of Blue who had been forced into exile in Germany and based themselves in Berlin, vowing to take revenge for the death of their admired leader. It is assumed that one of them assassinated Ka and took away the only extant copy of the poems he had written, the poems themselves are lost.

Awards and prizes
 2005 – Prix Médicis étranger
 2005 – shortlist of Independent Foreign Fiction Prize
 2006 – Prix Méditerranée Étranger

See also
 Headscarf controversy in Turkey
 Secularism in Turkey
 Islam in Turkey
 Ka-Mer, a Turkish women's group

References

External links

2002 novels
Turkish novels
Novels by Orhan Pamuk
Novels set in Turkey
Faber and Faber books
Metafictional novels